The human AMY1C gene encodes the protein Amylase, alpha 1C (salivary).

Amylases are secreted proteins that hydrolyze 1,4-alpha-glucoside bonds in oligosaccharides and polysaccharides, and thus catalyze the first step in digestion of dietary starch and glycogen. The human genome has a cluster of several amylase genes that are expressed at high levels in either the salivary gland or pancreas. This gene encodes an amylase isoenzyme produced by the salivary gland. See also .

References

External links

Further reading

Human proteins